San Miguel Ixitlán Municipality is a municipality in Puebla in south-eastern Mexico. It is one of 217 municipalities in the Mexican state of Puebla. It was founded on October 4th, 1926.

References

Municipalities of Puebla